Acianthera bicornuta is a species of orchid.

References

External links

bicornuta